The 2005 World Table Tennis Championships mixed doubles was the 48th edition of the mixed doubles championship.

Wang Liqin and Guo Yue defeated Liu Guozheng and Bai Yang in the final by four sets to three.

Seeds

  Wang Hao /  Wang Nan (quarterfinals)
  Wang Liqin /  Guo Yue (champions)
  Chen Qi /  Zhang Yining (fourth round)
  Liu Guozheng /  Bai Yang (semifinals)
  Hao Shuai /  Niu Jianfeng (quarterfinals)
  Ryu Seung-min /  Kim Hye-hyun (third round)
  Cheung Yuk /  Tie Ya Na (third round)
  Werner Schlager /  Liu Jia (quarterfinals)
  Ko Lai Chak /  Zhang Rui (fourth round)
  Qiu Yike /  Cao Zhen (semifinals)
  Leung Chu Yan /  Song Ah Sim (fourth round)
  Yan Sen /  Guo Yan (semifinals)
  Oh Sang-eun /  Lee Hyang-mi (fourth round)
  Adrian Crișan /  Otilia Bădescu (third round)
  Li Ching /  Lau Sui Fei (fourth round)
  Chuang Chih-yuan /  Huang Yi-hua (third round)
  Alexei Smirnov /  Svetlana Ganina (second round)
  Danny Heister /  Li Jiao (third round)
  Zoltan Fejer-Konnerth /  Nicole Struse (fourth round)
  Yang Min /  Nicoletta Stefanova (fourth round)
  Christian Süß /  Kristin Silbereisen (second round)
  Bastian Steger /  Elke Wosik (second round)
  Peter Fazekas /  Krisztina Tóth (third round)
  Fedor Kuzmin /  Irina Palina (first round)
  Lin Ju /  Wu Xue (third round)
  Ferenc Pazsy /  Georgina Póta (first round)
  Ilija Lupulesku /  Gao Jun (third round)
  Pak Won-chol /  Kim Hyang-mi (third round)
  Cai Xiaoli /  Li Jiawei (third round)
  Seiya Kishikawa /  Ai Fujinuma (quarterfinals)
  Ryusuke Sakamoto /  Ai Fukuhara (third round)
  Lee Jung-woo /  Moon Hyun-jung (third round)

Finals

References

External links
 Main draw archived from ITTF.
 Players' matches. ITTF.
 WM 2005 Shanghai (China). tt-wiki.info (in German).

-